Barren Fork is a stream in Franklin and Gasconade counties in the U.S. state of Missouri. It is a tributary of Boeuf Creek.

 
Barren Fork was named for the poor soil along its course.

See also
List of rivers of Missouri

References

Rivers of Franklin County, Missouri
Rivers of Gasconade County, Missouri
Rivers of Missouri